This is a list of hospitals in San Jose, California.

 Good Samaritan Hospital
 Kaiser Permanente Santa Clara Medical Center
 Kaiser Permanente San Jose Medical Center
 O'Connor Hospital 
 Regional Medical Center of San Jose
 San Jose Medical Center 
 Santa Clara Valley Medical Center 
 Stanford Hospital and Clinics 
 Forest Surgery Center LP
 Urgent Care
 Npmhu San Jose Branch
 Richmond Steven MS
 Lotus Medical Ctr
 El Camino Hospital Los Gatos
 Kaiser Permanente Fremont Medical Center
 Sequoia Hospital
 Alexian Extended Care Medical

See also
 Santa Clara County Health System

References

California, San Jose

Hospitals
Hospitals
San Jose, Hospitals
Hospitals, San Jose
San Jose